1995 Nehru Cup was held in Calcutta. This was the third time that Calcutta hosted Nehru Cup. and the 11th edition of the cup. The participating teams were Iraq, Russia U-20, Thailand, Uzbekistan U-20, India. Iraq won the tournament, defeating Russia U-20 1–0 in the final match, played at the Salt Lake Stadium. Baichung Bhutia, the future star striker for India debuted in this tourney and scored one goal for India in the tournament.

Matches

Final

Winners

References

1995
1994–95 in Indian football
1994–95 in Iraqi football
1995 in Russian football
1995 in Thai football
1995 in Uzbekistani football
1995 in Asian football